Alejandro Falla was the defending champion, but retired from his first round match.
João Souza won the title, defeating Thiago Alves 6–2, 6–4 in the final.

Seeds

Draw

Finals

Top half

Bottom half

References
 Main Draw
 Qualifying Draw

Seguros Bolivar Open Cali - Singles
2012 Singles